Allan Harris (28 December 1942 – 23 November 2017) was a footballer who played for Chelsea, Coventry City and Queens Park Rangers. His brother Ron was also a professional footballer.

Harris was a full-back and began his career with Chelsea, for whom he played 70 league games in his first stint with the club. He joined Coventry in 1964, spending two years there, before briefly returning to Chelsea again, where he played in their 1967 FA Cup final loss to Tottenham Hotspur.

He moved to Queens Park Rangers as a replacement for Jim Langley in 1967, and made his debut in August that year against Portsmouth. Harris was a member of the 1967–68 side that won promotion to the First Division for the first time in the club's history.

He played 94 league games for QPR before transferring to Plymouth Argyle in 1971, and later played for Cambridge United. He then joined non-league Hayes as player-manager in 1974, remaining until his dismissal in March 1975. He signed for St Patrick's Athletic in February 1976, along with Terry Venables, and made his debut on 22 February that year.

After retiring from playing, Harris went on to be assistant manager to Venables at Crystal Palace, QPR (helping the team reach the FA Cup Final in 1982 and win promotion to the First Division in 1982–83) and FC Barcelona (winning La Liga in 1984–85 and reaching the 1986 European Cup Final). He also led Egyptian side Al Ahly to the African Cup as Champions from 1993 to 1995.

He was the coach of the Malaysian national team from December 2000 to 2004.

Harris died on 23 November 2017 at the age of 74.

References

External links
 Argyle Review: Allan Harris

1942 births
2017 deaths
Footballers from the London Borough of Hackney
Queens Park Rangers F.C. players
Coventry City F.C. players
Plymouth Argyle F.C. players
Chelsea F.C. players
Cambridge United F.C. players
Expatriate football managers in Malaysia
League of Ireland players
St Patrick's Athletic F.C. players
Expatriate football managers in Egypt
Karşıyaka S.K. managers
Queens Park Rangers F.C. non-playing staff
Hayes F.C. managers
Association football defenders
English footballers
Expatriate association footballers in the Republic of Ireland
English football managers
FA Cup Final players